Madurai West may refer to:
 Madurai West block
 Madurai West (state assembly constituency)